Major League Wrestling (MLW) has held a variety of different professional wrestling tournaments competed for by professional wrestlers that are part of their roster.

Sporadic tournaments

MLW World Heavyweight Championship Tournament (2002)

The tournament to crown the inaugural MLW World Heavyweight Champion took place at Genesis on June 15, 2002.

MLW Global Tag Team Championship Tournament

A four-team tournament to determine the inaugural MLW Global Tag Team Championship took place between 2002 and 2003. The semi-final of the tournament took place at the King of Kings event on December 20, 2002 and the tournament finals took place at Revolutions on May 9, 2003.

J-Cup USA

J-Cup USA was a junior heavyweight single elimination tournament to determine the inaugural MLW World Junior Heavyweight Champion at WarGames on September 19, 2003.

GTC Carnival
GTC Carnival was a six-team tournament to determine the new #1 contenders for the Global Crown Tag Team Championship. The tournament that took place at MLW's Reloaded event on Night One and Night Two on January 9 and January 10, 2004. The first round took place on January 9 and the second round took place on January 10.

MLW National Openweight Championship Tournament

The tournament to determine the inaugural holder of the MLW National Openweight Championship took place between April 5, 2019 and June 1, 2019 at the Fury Road special, where the final took place. The semi-final matches aired on Fusion.

Opera Cup

The Opera Cup tournament is a professional wrestling single-elimination tournament held by Major League Wrestling (MLW). First introduced in 2019 at the namesake event, the tournament is a revival of the Professional Wrestling Opera House Cup, which had been last won by Stu Hart in 1948. The tournament was revived by MLW in 2019 and has become an annual recurring tournament.

Dates and venues of finals
<onlyinclude>{| class="wikitable"
!style="background: #e3e3e3;" width=5%|Year
!style="background: #e3e3e3;" width=20%|Winner
!style="background: #e3e3e3;" width=5%|Times won
!style="background: #e3e3e3;" width=15%|Finals date
!style="background: #e3e3e3;" width=20%|Runner-up
!style="background: #e3e3e3;" width=10%|Venue
!style="background: #e3e3e3;" width=30%|Location
|-
|2019
|Davey Boy Smith Jr.
|1
|
|Brian Pillman Jr.
|Melrose Ballroom
|Queens, New York, New York
|-
|2020
|Tom Lawlor
|1
|
|Low Ki
|GILT Nightclub
|Orlando, Florida
|-
|2021
|Davey Richards
|1
|
|TJP
|2300 Arena
|Philadelphia, Pennsylvania
|}

References

External links
Major League Wrestling official website

Major League Wrestling
Professional wrestling tournaments